The position of lieutenant governor of Ohio was established in 1852. The lieutenant governor becomes governor if the governor resigns, dies in office or is removed by impeachment. Before 1852, the president of the Ohio State Senate would serve as acting governor if a vacancy in the governorship occurred. Until 1978, lieutenant governors were elected separately but concurrently with the governor (not on a "ticket"). Thus, there were several occasions when the lieutenant governor was from a different party than the governor. This was changed by constitutional amendment. In 1974, Richard F. Celeste was the last lieutenant governor to be elected separately. In 1978, George Voinovich became the first lieutenant governor to be elected on the same ticket with the governor.

From 1852 to 1979, the lieutenant governor also served as the president of the Ohio State Senate. More recently, Ohio governors have generally named the lieutenant governor to head an agency of state government.  An example of this is Bruce Edward Johnson, who served as Director of the Ohio Department of Development, as did his successor, Lee Fisher. Recent Lt. Governor Mary Taylor was the director of the Ohio Department of Insurance, until she was replaced by Jillian Froment in 2017. 

The 28th lieutenant governor of Ohio, Warren G. Harding, later served as 29th president of the United States.

List of lieutenant governors

Parties

See also

List of Ohio lieutenant gubernatorial elections
List of governors of Ohio
List of United States senators from Ohio
List of United States representatives from Ohio
List of Ohio politicians

References

 
Lieutenant Governor
Ohio
1852 establishments in Ohio